Events from the year 1944 in Denmark.

Incumbents
 Monarch – Christian X
 Prime minister – German military rule

Sports
 Frem wins their sixth Danish football championship by winning the 1943–44 Danish War Tournament.

Births
 8 April – Anders Refn, film editor and director
 10 April – Jørgen Jensen, athlete (died 2009)
 11 April – Joen Bille, actor
 5 October – Nils Malmros, film director
 7 October – Claus Bjørn, author and historian (died 2005)

Deaths
 3 January – Aage Hertel, actor (born 1873)
 4 January – Kaj Munk, playwright and Lutheran priest (born 1898)
 7 September – Ole Olsen, sport shooter, Olympic bronze medalist in team free rifle in 1912 (born 1869)

Date unknown
 November – Jorgen Moeller, chess master (born 1873)

References

 
Denmark
Years of the 20th century in Denmark
1940s in Denmark
1944 in Europe